Melzerina lacordairei is a species of beetle in the family Cerambycidae, and the only species in the genus Melzerina. It was described by Gahan in 1889.

References

Hemilophini
Beetles described in 1889